The Luxembourgish National Badminton Championships is a tournament organized to crown the best badminton players in Luxembourg. They are held since 1984.

Past winners

References
Badminton Europe - Details of affiliated national organisations
Fédération Luxembourgeoise de Badminton Yearbook

Badminton tournaments in Luxembourg 
National badminton championships
Recurring sporting events established in 1984
Sports competitions in Luxembourg